Reading West is a constituency represented in the House of Commons of the UK Parliament since 2010 by Alok Sharma, a Conservative. He is currently serving in the Cabinet as the President for COP26. Sharma previously served as the Business Secretary, the International Development Secretary, and a minister in the Ministry for Housing, Communities and Local Government and the Department for Work and Pensions.

History 
The Reading West parliamentary constituency was first contested in 1983, when it was won by a member of the Conservative Party, Tony Durant, the sitting MP for the abolished Reading North constituency. He held the seat through two subsequent general elections until he retired at the 1997 election.

The constituency was then won by Martin Salter for Labour, as part of the landslide that brought Labour back to power under Tony Blair. Salter held the seat through the 13 years of Labour government until Parliament was dissolved in April 2010, but did not stand in the 2010 general election, when Alok Sharma won the seat for the Conservatives.

Constituency profile 
Since its 1983 creation the constituency has been a bellwether paradigm example of a marginal seat. Boundary changes have taken in areas of population expansion to the east in new largely private sector housing estates for the 2010 election. Unemployment is close to the regional average, which is lower than the national average and the constituency has seen a marked increase in properties and property prices throughout from 2001 to 2011 period which has seen town centre regeneration and investment by a Labour Party-controlled council enhanced by Reading railway station hub improvements and enterprise areas equally.

Boundaries and boundary changes 

1983–1997: The Borough of Reading wards of Battle, Katesgrove, Kentwood, Minster, Norcot, Southcote, and Tilehurst, and the District of Newbury wards of Calcot, Pangbourne, Purley, Theale, and Tilehurst.

Formed as a county constituency, largely from parts of the abolished Borough Constituency of Reading North. Extended westwards to include parts of the County Constituency of Newbury.

1997–2010: The Borough of Reading wards of Battle, Kentwood, Minster, Norcot, Southcote, Tilehurst, and Whitley, and the District of Newbury wards of Calcot, Pangbourne, Purley, Theale, and Tilehurst.

The boundary with Reading East was realigned, gaining Whitley ward and losing Katesgrove ward.

2010–present: The Borough of Reading wards of Battle, Kentwood, Minster, Norcot, Southcote, Tilehurst, and Whitley, and the District of West Berkshire wards of Birch Copse, Calcot, Pangbourne, Purley on Thames, Theale, and Westwood.

Marginal changes due to revision of local authority wards.

The constituency is bordered by the seats of Newbury, Henley, Reading East, and Wokingham.

Members of Parliament

Elections

Elections in the 2010s

Elections in the 2000s

Elections in the 1990s

Elections in the 1980s

See also 
 List of parliamentary constituencies in Berkshire

Notes

References

Parliamentary constituencies in Berkshire
Politics of Reading, Berkshire
Constituencies of the Parliament of the United Kingdom established in 1983